Airdrie Football Club was a Scottish association football club based in the town of Airdrie, Lanarkshire.

History

The club was founded in 1868 and disbanded in 1890. The club competed in the Scottish Cup between 1875 and 1890.

Its first Cup tie against Hamilton ended in a goalless draw, although Airdrie played "apparently with the motive that charging was the sole motive and end of the game".

Colours

Its original colours were blue and scarlet stripes.  From 1884 onwards, the club's home colours were white shirts with green tassels and white shorts.

Grounds

The club's first ground was "three-quarters of a mile from town", the nearest station being South Side.

External links

Scottish Cup results

References 

Defunct football clubs in Scotland
Association football clubs established in 1868
1868 establishments in Scotland
Association football clubs disestablished in 1890
1890 disestablishments in Scotland